Mavis Tchibota Dufounou (born 7 May 1996) is a Congolese footballer who plays as a left winger for Israeli Premier League club Maccabi Haifa and the Congo national football team.

Club career
Tchibota began his career in his native Congolese league playing for Diables Noirs, before officially joining the system of Israeli side Maccabi Tel Aviv in 2015. He spent the majority of his time out on loan with fellow Israeli Premier League side Hapoel Kfar Saba, joining in July 2015. He scored his opening senior goal in his second match, notching a seventy second-minute winner over Maccabi Haifa. Tchibota stayed for the 2015–16 and 2016–17 seasons, netting ten times in sixty-nine fixtures in all competitions for Hapoel Kfar Saba. Bnei Yehuda signed Tchibota on loan on 4 July 2017. Twelve months later, he was signed permanently via a swap for Maor Kandil.

On 19 February 2019, Bulgarian First League club Ludogorets Razgrad announced Tchibota had penned a pre-contract agreement with the club; effective from the succeeding June. He scored on his competitive debut for them, netting in their 2–0 Bulgarian Supercup victory over Lokomotiv Plovdiv on 3 July. After a further goal in UEFA Europa League qualifying against The New Saints, Tchibota scored his first league goal on 22 September versus Arda Kardzhali. He netted a hat-trick on 25 September in the Bulgarian Cup versus second tier team Neftochimic. In February 2022 Tchibota returned to Israel, joining Maccabi Haifa.

International career
Tchibota was selected in the Congo under-17 squad for the 2011 FIFA U-17 World Cup in Mexico. He won four caps as his nation advanced from Group A, prior to losing in the following round to Uruguay. He received a stadium ovation from fans in Congo's tournament opener against the Netherlands. He represented the Congo under-20s in 2014. In September 2017, Tchibota was called up to the senior team for 2018 FIFA World Cup qualifiers against Ghana. He won his debut cap on 5 September as Congo lost 1–5 in Brazzaville. His second cap came in October 2020 in a friendly against Gambia.

Personal life
Tchibota was born in Pointe-Noire, Republic of the Congo. He is the son of former Congo international footballer Pierre Tchibota. He arrived in Israel at the age of fifteen with his mother, though further difficulties delayed their entry to the local youth club of Maccabi Tel Aviv. In 2016, Tchibota applied for Israeli citizenship by marriage. In September 2017, he made his competitive debut for Congo. In January 2018, Tchibota received his temporary residence identity card. In May 2016, he married his Israeli partner Karolina in Cyprus. They have one daughter together named Adelle. That same month, he became an Israeli citizen.

Career statistics

Club
.

International
.

Honours
Bnei Yehuda
Israel State Cup: 2018–19

Ludogorets
First League: 2019–20, 2020–21
Bulgarian Supercup: 2019, 2021

Maccabi Haifa
 Israeli Premier League: 2021–22

References

External links

1996 births
Living people
People from Pointe-Noire
Republic of the Congo footballers
Association football forwards
CSMD Diables Noirs players
Maccabi Tel Aviv F.C. players
Hapoel Kfar Saba F.C. players
Bnei Yehuda Tel Aviv F.C. players
PFC Ludogorets Razgrad players
Maccabi Haifa F.C. players
Israeli Premier League players
First Professional Football League (Bulgaria) players
Republic of the Congo international footballers
Republic of the Congo expatriate footballers
Expatriate footballers in Israel
Expatriate footballers in Bulgaria
Republic of the Congo expatriate sportspeople in Israel
Republic of the Congo expatriate sportspeople in Bulgaria